Thay may refer to:

Thầy Temple, a Buddhist temple in Hanoi, Vietnam
Thích Nhất Hạnh (1926 – 2022), nicknamed Thầy (Vietnamese: teacher), a Vietnamese monk and peace activist
Dalek Thay, a character in the Doctor Who TV series
 Thays, a Pakistani TV drama serial

See also

Thai (disambiguation)
Tai (disambiguation)
Tay (disambiguation)
Kok Thay (disambiguation)
Kok Thay (given name)